Ntikkakkakkoru Premondarnn is a Malayalam language film, directed by Adhil Maimoonath Asharaf. The film stars Bhavana in the lead role, along with Sharaf U Dheen and Ashokan. The film was announced in March 2022 and the principal photography started on 20 June 2022. The film marked the come back of Bhavana in the Malayalam film industry after a gap of six years. It was released on 24 February 2023.

Summary 
Ntikkakkakkoru Premondarnn is the story of a man, his little sister, his love and his first love.

Cast 
 Bhavana as Nithya
 Sharaf U Dheen as Jimmy
 Ashokan as Abdulkhadar
 Shebin Benson
 Anarkali Nazar as Fida
 Saniya Rafi as Mariyam
 Afsana Lakshmi as Yasmin
 Master Dhruvin

Production
Debutant director Adhil Maimoonath Asharaf was an associate director to Amal Neerad. The film was wrapped up on 18 September, 2022 after 60 days of shoot across 12 locations.

References

External links
 

Indian romantic comedy films
2022 directorial debut films
Upcoming films
Upcoming Malayalam-language films